VESTROCK is a festival in Hulst, in the Dutch province of Zeeland, which has been organized since 2010. The festival focuses primarily on alternative music, dance, theater and education and is themed Mixing Music, Art & Science. The festival was nominated ten times for a European Festival Award and is in the top 10 of best European Boutique Festivals.

History

2019  

Visitors: 27.500, Art Works: Just Dimi, Graffiti for You, Windmill park, Tuig Tattoo Weather: Sunny, Vr: 22 °C, Za: 26 °C, Zo 31 °C.

2018  
Visitors: 25.000, Art Works: Just Dimi, Graffiti for You, Tuig Tattoo Weather: Cloudy with some rain & Sunny, Vr: 21 °C, Za: 23 °C, Zo 25 °C.

2017 
Visitors: 25.000, Art Works: Just Dimi, Weather: Sunny, Vr: 21 °C, Za: 21 °C, Zo 21 °C.

2016 
Visitors: 25.000, Art Works: St. Joost VJ's, Weather: Cloudy, Vr: 20 °C, Za: 22 °C, Zo 27 °C.

2015 
Visitors: 21.000, Art Works: Jochem "Srek" Cats, Sjors "Maedist" Kouthoofd, Tobias "Klash" Beacker Hoff, Daxx, Weather: Sunny, Vr: 33 °C, Za: 23 °C, Zo 25 °C.

2014 
Visitors: 17.500, Art Works: Daxx, Dimitri Sponselee, Weather: Sunny, Vr: 27.2 °C, Za: 29.6 °C, Zo 28.1 °C.

2013 
Visitors: 12.500 (sold out), Art Works: Georges Cuvillier, Upgrade de Wereld, Weather: Cloudy, Vr: 17.2 °C, Za: 13.6 °C.

2012 
Visitors: 8500 (sold out), Art Works: Gert_39, Willem Boel, Weather: Partly Cloudy, Vr: 19.6 °C, Za: 18.2 °C.

2011 
Visitors: 3500 (sold out), Art Works: Georges Cuvillier, Egied Simons, Denis Oudendijk, Walt Van Beek, Weather: Sunny, 29.9 °C.

2010 
Visitors: 2500 (sold out), Art Works: Rene van Corven, Lieven Standaert, Gilberto Esparza, Will Beckers, Jef Faes, Raphael Opstaele, Frank F. Castelyns, Francesco Fransera, Jason van der Woude, Weather: Sunny, 27.5 °C.

Trivia 
 Since 2011, an educational program, with a focus on sustainability, was added to the program, called VESTROCK UNIVERSITY. Scientists and prominent speakers give lectures on sustainability, climate change and topical themes as the silent disco concept. VESTROCK UNIVERSITY was made possible by the support of Ghent, Duvel and DELTA Zealand fund.
 Since 2012, the festival was expanded to include a festival for children under the name VESTROCK JUNIOR. On this day no alcoholic beverages are allowed.
 Each year, hundreds of volunteers have helped make VESTROCK possible.
 In 2013, CLUB ACOUSTIC, an intimate acoustic stage for singer-songwriters, was added to the festival.
 In 2014, a 3rd festival and a festival site was added. The unique specialty VEST ROCK BLOND ROCK VEST was presented which was the first Dutch Festival with its own specialty!
 In 2015, CLUB ACOUSTIC was replaced by THE LIVING, a small, cozy "living room" stage. In St. Willibrordusbasiliek a new 5th stage was achieved with only acoustic performances in an intimate setting.
 In 2016, THE LIVING was replaced by THE CHAPEL, a fabulous, wooden church with more space.
 In 2017 the TENT stage got bigger and the VESTWALK was added to the program.
 In 2018 The BREWERY stage (where VESTROCK BLOND is born) was added to the program.
 In 2019 CANAL BOAT SESSIONS and a special program for senior citizens in the Basilica were added to the program.

External links 
 

Music festivals in the Netherlands
Music in Zeeland
Tourist attractions in Zeeland
Hulst